La soledad (English: Solitary Fragments) is a 2007 Spanish drama film written and directed by Jaime Rosales. It  was Rosales's second film: he had previously made, The Hours of the Day. Solitary Fragments (La soledad), divided in five chapters, follows a dual narrative, the characters' lives unfold as a series of everyday concerns over health, work, shelter, relationships and money. Made with a small budget and with actors from the theater scene, the film was nominated for 3 Goya Awards, Spain's most prestigious film awards. It won all three awards, including the Best Film and Director award. Voted by Spanish film critics as Best Film of the year for that reason, it was given the  Fotogramas de Plata Award.

Plot
Adela, a young woman recently separated from her husband and with one-year-old baby, is tired of her life in a small hometown  Leon. She leaves behind the mountains and the country life to move to Madrid. She gets a job as a hostess and moves into an apartment with Carlos and Ines, a nice young couple. The three get along well then, sharing meals, doubts and leisure. Antonia, Ines's mother, has a small neighborhood supermarket. She leads a fairly quiet life with her boyfriend Manolo. Antonia has two more daughters: Nieves and Helena, the eldest. However, little by little, Antonias's pleasant life begins to crumble. First, a doctors detects that Nieves has cancer. Later, the already tense relationship between her daughters gets more complicated when Helena asks her mother borrowed money to buy an apartment on the beach.

Adela has no major difficulties in adapting to urban life, even though the father of her baby does not help her economically. While traveling by bus, she is one of the victims of a terrorist attack, leaving her life in tatters. From that moment she should find the strength to return to a normal life.

Cast 
 María Bazán - Helena
 Petra Martínez - Antonia
 Sonia Almarcha - Adela
 Miriam Correa - Inés
 Nuria Mencía - Nieves
 Jesús Cracio - Manolo
  - Carlos
 José Luis Torrijo - Pedro
 Juan Margallo - Padre Adela

Awards and nominations 
To see the complete list of awards and nominations, see this link.

Goya Awards
Best Director (Jaime Rosales, winner)
Best Film (winner)
Best New Actor (José Luis Torrijo, winner)

Spanish Actors Union 
Best Actress (Petra Martínez, nominee)

References 
 Interview with Jaime Rosales tras recibir los Premios Goya, 20 minutos, February 5, 2008 
Son pocos, son valientes El País, February 10, 2008

External links
 

2007 films
2007 drama films
2000s Spanish-language films
Films set in Madrid
Best Film Goya Award winners
Spanish drama films
2000s Spanish films